San Fernando High School (SFHS) is a high school of the Los Angeles Unified School District. It is located in the Pacoima neighborhood of Los Angeles, in the northeastern San Fernando Valley, California. It is near and also serves the City of San Fernando.

History
San Fernando High School—SFHS—was established in 1896, and was originally known as the San Fernando Union High School (SFUHS). It is one of the oldest high schools in the Los Angeles Unified School District. SFHS was originally located at Fifth and Hagar streets in the City of San Fernando.

In 1906, the school moved to a new campus on North Brand Boulevard. San Fernando High School moved again in 1952, to its present location.

It was in the Los Angeles City High School District until 1961, when it merged into LAUSD.

The auditorium was renamed after Cesar Chavez in a dedication ceremony on June 11, 2000, seven years after Chavez's death.

Description
The San Fernando High School colors are black and gold.

School attendance boundaries
Students in the City of San Fernando are assigned to the school.  Originally more of the Pacoima neighborhood was zoned to the school, but much of it was reassigned to Arleta High School upon that school's opening in 2006. Students in the San Fernando Gardens public housing complex in Pacoima are still assigned to San Fernando High School. 

San Fernando High School's attendance boundary changed numerous times as well as new high schools opening in the area. In the fall of 2006, 9th and 10th grade students in a portion of San Fernando High School's 2005-2006 school year zone attended Arleta High School instead of San Fernando ; Arleta will phase in grades 11 through 12 .

SFHS was further relieved of overcrowding when César Chávez Learning Academies (Valley Region High School 5) opened in 2011.

Demographics
During 2020-2021, the school had 2,044 students and 110 faculty members.

In 2000, 10% of faculty had attended San Fernando High School as students. At the time the school was actively seeking alumni to be teachers. Many of the teachers who were alumni of San Fernando High were bilingual and could offer assistance to Spanish-speaking students.

School programs
In 2008 it was announced that San Fernando High School would start on a traditional academic calendar, rather than the "year-round" staggered calendar to accommodate overcrowding, in the fall of that year. The traditional calendar allows all three tracks (A, B, and C-track; roughly 3300 students in total) to join as one academic class. It also made it impossible for the city's planned charter middle school to take campus facilities from San Fernando High School.

SFHS was the only high school in California with Project G.R.A.D. (Graduation Really Achieves Dreams), which has now expanded to Arleta and Sylmar high schools and César Chávez Learning Academies.

Athletics

Football
Operating the wishbone offense (a rarity in California) with future USC stars Charles White and Kevin Williams, San Fernando High won the L.A. City Football title in 1974 and 1975, repeating the 1934, 1937, 1953 and 1967 season championships. Prior to the 1975 season, they were ranked #1 in the country. In 1976 they lost their first game of the season to Gardena High School by a score of 41-0. The team rebounded, losing only one more game (and defeating John Elway's Granada Hills High School team along the way) to earn a spot in the city playoffs. They went on to defeat Banning High School to win the city title. In 2012 the team lost to Van Nuys and Sylmar high schools out of their ten games making them 8-2, leading them to the Division 2 Championship against Canoga Park High School. They repeated in 2013, becoming back-to-back champions. In 2017 SFHS defeated Dorsey High School for the Division 1 Championship with a score of 28-21. San Fernando High's football stadium is named for Charles White.

Wrestling
The San Fernando High School wrestling team currently holds the largest number of city championships in Los Angeles. They have been the City Wrestling Champions in 1977, 1979, 1980, 1982, 1983, 1987, 1991, 2001—2003, 2006—2009, 2012—2015, and 2017.

During the 2006 season, the Tiger wrestling team had an undefeated season, with a record of 21-0. The 2006 wrestling team took first place at the C.I.F. championship, with five of their wrestlers qualifying for the State championship.

In 2013, Johnny Parada became the first ever CIF wrestling state champion from the Los Angeles City Section when he defeated Wyatt Wyckoff of Paradise High School 13-6 for the 126 lbs. title.

Baseball
1988 City Championship runners-up; lost to Monroe High School.

1991, 2011 & 2013 City Baseball Team Champions. In  1991, the Tigers beat Banning High School 3-2 at Dodger Stadium. In 2011, the Tigers beat El Camino Real Charter High School 2-0 at USC in the semifinals and beat Chatsworth High School 8-6 at Dodger Stadium in the final. In 2013, the Tigers beat Cleveland High School 2-1 in the final, again at Dodger Stadium.

Soccer
1973 City Soccer Team Champions. When LAUSD offered soccer as an official sport, the Tigers won the first-ever championship against Franklin High School, 2 to 1.

2010 City Soccer Team Champions. Played in the Southern California Regional Playoffs up to semi-finals.

Basketball
1981 Basketball League Champions; 1988 Varsity Basketball League Champions.

Notable alumni
Sev Aszkenazy, real estate developer
Ivan Becerra, former professional soccer player
Raul Bocanegra, California State Assemblyman
Buddy Bradford, former Major League Baseball player
Tony Cárdenas, U.S. Congressman
Charmian Carr ‘60,  actress
Bobby Chacon, boxer
Anthony Davis, NFL and Canadian Football League player
Felipe Fuentes, former California State Assemblyman, Los Angeles City Councilmember
Mike Glyer, Hugo-winning fanzine publisher 
Miguel Gonzalez, Major League Baseball player
Jack Hiatt, former Major League Baseball player
Barbara Lee, U.S. Congresswoman
George Lopez, actor, comedian
Nury Martinez, community activist, former Los Angeles City Council President
Gary Matthews, former Major League Baseball player
Natasha Melnick, actress, musician
Cindy Montañez, former California State Assemblywoman
Malcolm Moore, former NFL and USFL player
Alex Padilla, U.S. Senator from California; former California Secretary of State, State Senator, and Los Angeles City Councilmember
Rashaad Reynolds, footballer
Monica Rodriguez, Los Angeles City Councilmember
Herschel Curry Smith, track coach
Ritchie Valens, singer (killed in airplane crash)
Jacob Vargas, actor and producer
Charles White, football player

References

External links

 

Los Angeles Unified School District schools
High schools in the San Fernando Valley
High schools in Los Angeles
Public high schools in California
Educational institutions established in 1896
1896 establishments in California
Pacoima, Los Angeles
San Fernando, California